Om Shanti is a 2010 Telugu-language film directed by Prakash Dantuluri. It stars Navdeep and Kajal Aggarwal, making it their third film together. Bindu Madhavi, Aditi Sharma, Nikhil Siddharth, and R. Madhavan play supporting roles.

Plot
Anand (Navdeep) is a bachelor who works in a software company. Everything goes well for him and he is happy. He wants to settle down in life by getting married and meets Anjali (Aditi Sharma) in the process. Meghana (Kajal Aggarwal) is a lady full of dreams, and she seeks thrills all the time. She is a college-goer and adores RJ Maddy (R. Madhavan) madly. Teja (Nikhil Siddharth) is a struggler in the film industry and feels he has it in him to become the next Ravi Teja. Noori's (Bindu Madhavi) marriage is settled with Akbar (Kiriti Rambhatla). Her brother plots to plant bombs in the main places of Hyderabad. Reddy (Murali Mohan) is a farmer who loves his land and believes in agriculture. His son wants to sell off all the land so they can migrate to Hyderabad and live a plush life. Reddy dies, and his wife (Pragathi) comes to Hyderabad along with her son's family. Meanwhile, Anand and Anjali fall in love. Everyone's lives and plans are suddenly endangered by the bomb blast planned by Noori's brother. Reddy's wife, Meghana, and Teja are all affected and while they try to fend off threats, Anand comes and saves the day.

Cast

 Navdeep as Anand
 Kajal Aggarwal as Meghana
 Bindu Madhavi as Noori
 Aditi Sharma as Anjali
 Nikhil Siddharth as Teja
 Adivi Sesh as Aditya
 Murali Mohan as Reddy
 Pragathi as Reddy's wife
 Tanikella Bharani
 Kishore
 Suman Setty
 Sunil Ranadhir 
 Ravi Kale
 Raghu Babu
 Siva Reddy
 Narasimha
 R. Madhavan as RJ Maddy (cameo appearance)

Soundtrack
Music composed by Ilaiyaraaja. Songs received good response especially "Chinna Pokile" and Flying on the moon. Music released on Sony.

References

External links
 

2010s Telugu-language films
2010 films
Hyperlink films
Films scored by Ilaiyaraaja